Little Rock, Minnesota may refer to the following places in the U.S. state of Minnesota:
Little Rock, Beltrami County, Minnesota, a census-designated place
Little Rock, Morrison County, Minnesota, an unincorporated community